The Northern Canada Power Commission, formerly the Northwest Territories Power Commission, was a federal Crown corporation established by the Government of Canada to serve as the electric utility for northern Canada. The assets of the NCPC were transferred to the territorial governments of Yukon and the Northwest Territories in the 1980s to form Yukon Energy and the Northwest Territories Power Corporation.

References

See also
 Qulliq Energy, an electricity utility created from Northwest Territories Power Corporation during the establishment of Nunavut.

Defunct electric power companies of Canada
Former Crown corporations of Canada
1948 establishments in Canada
1988 disestablishments in Canada
Companies based in Edmonton